Giacomo Micalori (1570 – 1645) was an Italian theologian, philosopher and astronomer.

Life 
Born in Urbino in 1570, he became in 1600 a canon of the Urbino Cathedral. He was professor of theology and philosophy at the University of Urbino.

His main work in four books, Della sfera mondiale, printed in Urbino in 1626 by Marc' Antonio Mazzantini with many astronomical illustrations, is a relevant work of disclosure against judicial astrology, with details about telescope and zodiac.

He vigorously disputed with Erycius Puteanus (Erik van de Putte) about his proposal of a calendrical date line. He was also author of a comedy and a drama.

He died in Urbino in 1645.

Works

References 

17th-century Italian astronomers
1645 deaths
1570 births
17th-century Italian Roman Catholic theologians
Canons (priests)
People from Urbino